The 1971 U.S. Professional Indoor was a WCT and Virginia Slims Circuit tennis tournament played on indoor carpet courts. It was played at the Spectrum in Philadelphia, Pennsylvania in the United States. It was the fourth edition of the tournament and was held from February 9 through February 14, 1971. John Newcombe and Rosie Casals won the singles titles.

Finals

Men's singles

 John Newcombe defeated  Rod Laver 7–6(7–5), 7–6(7–1), 6–4
 It was Newcombe's 1st title of the year and the 12th of his professional career.

Woman's singles
 Rosie Casals defeated  Françoise Dürr 6–2, 3–6, 6–2

References

U.S. Professional Indoor
U.S. Pro Indoor
U.S. Professional Indoor
U.S. Professional Indoor
U.S. Professional Indoor